The Indoor Golf Group Challenge is a golf tournament on the Challenge Tour. It will first be played in 2022 in Helsingborg, Sweden, the last of two Challenge Tour events held in Sweden in August 2022.

The tournament is held at Allerum Golf Club, home also to the Allerum Open on the LET Access Series.

Winners

Notes

References

External links
Coverage on the Challenge Tour's official site

Challenge Tour events
Golf tournaments in Sweden
Recurring sporting events established in 2022